Elvis Crespo Díaz (born July 30, 1971) is a Puerto Rican singer of the Merengue genre. He has won multiple awards, including a Grammy and a Latin Grammy Award in merengue music.

Early years
Crespo was born in New York City and was named "Elvis" after Elvis Presley. He was raised in the city of Guaynabo, Puerto Rico, where he spent his childhood and adolescent years.

Musical career
He first gained fame in the mid-90s when he joined Grupo Mania, in Puerto Rico. Eventually he decided to try to go solo in 1998. His debut album, Suavemente was a hit, both in Latin America and in the US. The single "Suavemente" was a huge hit and eventually helped him earn the Best Male Tropical/Salsa Album of the Year from Billboard magazine. His album went platinum in the Venezuelan and Central American markets and gold in Chile. Released in 1998, Crespo's debut also earned a gold album for sales of over 500,000 copies in the first year after its release in the United States. "Suavemente" set a record for holding the top position on Billboard's Hot Latin Tracks chart for six weeks. Part of the song's success was its unexpected crossover appeal to English-speaking listeners, particularly in Miami and New York." His album was mostly merengue influenced, but his follow-up albums would venture from these roots eventually. Wow Flash! is Elvis Crespo's third solo recording for Sony Music. Elvis Crespo's latest album, Regresó el Jefe, went on sale on 5 June 2007, with its first single being "La Foto Se Me Borró." He dedicated this album to his niece, Wilmarie Agosto Crespo, who died in a car accident on March 28, 2007. In 2016 Elvis was featured on Deorro's number one hit song "Bailar" which was featured on a Target Corporation Commercial.

Personal life
On March 16, 2009, Crespo married his manager, Maribel Vega, in Puerto Rico.

Crespo was investigated by the Miami-Dade Police Department and the Federal Bureau of Investigation (FBI) after he allegedly performed a sex act and exposed himself in view of other passengers aboard an airplane flight from Houston, Texas to Miami, Florida on March 26, 2009. He was interviewed upon his arrival but was not arrested and no charges were filed. When asked by police at the airport about the accusation, Crespo reportedly said "I don’t recall doing that". On July 10, 2013, an intoxicated Crespo was allegedly expelled from a casino in Isla Verde, Puerto Rico for harassing a female employee, before he later became involved in a physical confrontation with local restaurant owner Alexander de Jesús after he attempted to steal a bottle of alcohol from his restaurant. De Jesús subsequently filed a complaint against Crespo, opening a police investigation. In a December 2013 interview with Al Rojo Vivo, Crespo addressed both incidents, saying that he was ashamed, and that his behavior stemmed from his struggles with alcohol and drug addiction.

Discography

Studio albums
 1998: Suavemente
 1999: Píntame
 1999: The Remixes
 2000: Wow! Flash
 2002: Urbano
 2004: Saboréalo
 2007: Regresó el Jefe
 2010: Indestructible
 2012: Los Monsters
 2013: One Flag
 2015: Tatuaje
 2018: Diomedizao
 2021: Regresó el Jefe 2.0
 2021: Multitudes

Awards

This is a list of awards and nominations of Puerto Rican merengue artist Elvis Crespo. Here are some of the awards he has won during his musical career.

Premio Lo Nuestro
1999

Tropical: Album of the Year (Suavemente)
Tropical: Male Artist of the Year
Tropical: Best New Artist
Tropical: Song of the Year (Suavemente)
2000
Tropical: Album of the Year (Pintame)
Tropical: Male Artist of the Year
Tropical: Song of the Year (Pintame)
2001
Merengue: Artist of the Year
People Choice Awards: Tropical Artist of the Year
2003
Merengue: Artist of the Year
2005
Merengue: Artist of the Year
2012
Merengue: Artist of the Year

Grammy Awards
1999 
Best Merengue Performance (Pintame)

Latin Grammys
2005
Best Merengue Album (Saborealo)

See also

List of Puerto Rican songwriters
List of Puerto Ricans
Merengue

References 

1971 births
Merengue musicians
People from Guaynabo, Puerto Rico
20th-century Puerto Rican male singers
Grammy Award winners
Latin Grammy Award winners
Living people
American people of Puerto Rican descent
Machete Music artists
Sony Discos artists
Latin music songwriters
21st-century Puerto Rican male singers